The Wellington Sevens, also known as the New Zealand Sevens or for sponsorship reasons the NZI Sevens, is played annually as part of the IRB Sevens World Series for international rugby sevens (seven-a-side version of rugby union). The 2007 competition, which took place on 2 and 3 February was played at Westpac Stadium in Wellington as part of the 2006-07 IRB Sevens World Series.

The competition was won by Samoa, marking their first-ever overall title in a leg of the IRB Sevens World Series.

Pool stages

Pool A

|width=10| 
|Results
 Fiji 42 - 0 Portugal
 France 17 - 14 USA
 Fiji 43 - 0 USA
 France 22 - 14 Portugal
 Portugal 26 - 21 USA
 Fiji 47 - 7 France
|}

Pool B

|width=10| 
|Results
 South Africa 24 - 10 Canada
 Australia 35 - 17 Cook Islands
 South Africa 31 - 12 Cook Islands
 Australia 12 - 26 Canada
 Canada 12 - 24 Cook Islands
 South Africa 27 - 7 Australia
|}

Pool C

|width=10| 
|Results
 England 33 - 12 Scotland
 Samoa 26 - 0 Papua New Guinea
 England 22 - 7 Papua New Guinea
 Samoa 31 - 26 Scotland
 Scotland 17 - 12 Papua New Guinea
 England 12 - 19 Samoa
|}

Pool D

|width=10| 
|Results
 New Zealand 38 - 0 Kenya 
 Argentina 12 - 14 Tonga
 New Zealand 19 - 5 Tonga
 Argentina 14 - 32 Kenya
 Kenya 24 - 7 Tonga
 New Zealand 33 - 5 Argentina
|}

Finals
 1/4 final Bowl - Portugal 12 - 24 Cook Islands
 1/4 final Bowl - Tonga 19 - 12 Papua New Guinea
 1/4 final Bowl - Scotland 12 - 17 Argentina
 1/4 final Bowl - Australia 33 - 12 USA
 1/4 final Cup - Fiji 60 - 0 Canada
 1/4 final Cup - New Zealand 14 - 7 England
 1/4 final Cup - Samoa 26 - 21 Kenya
 1/4 final Cup - South Africa 26 - 14 France
 SF Shield - Portugal 26 - 19 Papua New Guinea
 SF Shield - Scotland 26 - 19 USA
 SF Bowl - Cook Islands 7 - 29 Tonga
 SF Bowl - Argentina 26 - 21 Australia
 SF Plate - Canada 7 - 29 England
 SF Plate - Kenya 5 - 26 France
 SF Cup - Fiji 31 - 0 New Zealand
 SF Cup - Samoa 14 - 12 South Africa
 Final Shield - Portugal 26 - 24 Scotland
 Final Bowl - Tonga 5 - 12 Argentina
 Final Plate - England 21 - 12 France
 Final Cup - Fiji 14 - 17 Samoa

Round 3 table

Notes and references

External links
 

Wellington
Wellington Sevens
2007